Jason Michael Beck (born 1980) is an American football coach and former player who is current serving as the offensive coordinator (OC) for Syracuse since December 2022. Prior to Syracuse, he was the quarterbacks coach at the University of Virginia and Brigham Young University (BYU), his alma mater, each under head coach Bronco Mendenhall, and as the quarterbacks coach at Syracuse under head coach Dino Babers.

Career

Early life and playing career
Beck was born in Oxnard, California to John and Mary Beck. He attended Hueneme High School. Beck served a 2-year mission in Denver for the Church of Jesus Christ of Latter-day Saints prior to his collegiate career, from 1999-2001.

Beck spent his freshman season at Ventura College and then moved to the College of the Canyons in Santa Clarita, California, where he led the Canyon Cougars to an 11-1 season and Western State Conference title as a sophomore. He was a unanimous first-team All-Conference pick, throwing for 2,052 yards while completing 77.5% of his passes. He also added 430 rushing yards. He was also named to the Junior college Academic All-American list.

After transferring to BYU, Beck served as the backup to All-American quarterback John Beck (no relation) from 2004-2006. In his lone start in a 38-0 victory over Utah State his senior season, Beck totaled 553 passing yards and 28 rushing yards, including 305 yards on 20-of-28 passing.

Beck earned bachelor's and master's degrees in communications from BYU in 2006 and 2011.

Coaching career
Beck began as offensive intern at BYU in 2007 and then worked in the same position with LSU Tigers. He worked under former BYU head coach, Gary Crowton who was the offensive coordinator on Les Miles's 2008 team.

In 2009, he was hired head coach Ron McBride as quarterbacks coach at Weber State in Ogden, Utah. At Weber State, he coached quarterback Cameron Higgins, who completed his four-year standout career as one of the top players in Weber State history and set many school records.

In 2012, Beck was named the offensive coordinator at Simon Fraser in Burnaby, British Columbia, Canada. At SFU, he turned around offense from being ranked last in Great Northwest Athletic Conference (in 2011) to first place in total offense, passing offense and scoring offense in 2012.

In 2013, he returned to his alma mater BYU where he served as quarterbacks coach until his resignation December 9, 2015. He was hired by offensive coordinator Robert Anae.

In 2015, Beck accepted the quarterbacks coach position at the University of Virginia, with Robert Anae as the offensive coordinator, going from BYU with Bronco Mendenhall who was appointed the university's new head football coach. Beck left this position after Mendenhall announced his retirement from the head coaching job.

Beck was hired as Syracuse's quarterbacks coach on December 26, 2021. After Anae left for the same position at NC State in December 2022, Beck was promoted to offensive coordinator by Head Coach Dino Babers.

Beck has coached three quarterbacks who have gone on to have NFL careers: Taysom Hill, Kurt Benkert, and Bryce Perkins.

Personal life
Beck married Jaime Rendich, an All-American BYU soccer standout, in December 2005. The couple has a daughter and twin sons.

References

External links
 Syracuse profile
 Virginia profile
 BYU profile

Living people
1980 births
People from Oxnard, California
21st-century Mormon missionaries
Latter Day Saints from California
American football quarterbacks
Players of American football from California
Ventura Pirates football players
College of the Canyons Cougars football players
BYU Cougars football players
BYU Cougars football coaches
LSU Tigers football coaches
Simon Fraser Clan football coaches
Syracuse Orange football coaches
Virginia Cavaliers football coaches
Weber State Wildcats football coaches